Cláudio Rodrigo Siqueira Carolino (born 17 August 1977), known simply as Cláudio, is a Brazilian former footballer who played as a central defender.

He spent his entire professional career in Portugal, appearing in 202 games in the Segunda Liga and scoring ten goals in as many seasons, representing mainly Vizela. He added 50 matches and 12 goals in the Primeira Liga, with Gil Vicente.

Club career
Born in São Gonçalo, Rio de Janeiro, Cláudio only played lower league or amateur football in his country. In 2000 he moved to Portugal, signing with A.D. Ovarense of the Segunda Liga.

In the following years, Cláudio alternated between the second and third divisions of Portuguese football, representing mainly F.C. Vizela. In the 2010–11 season, he contributed 23 games and one goal as Gil Vicente F.C. returned to the Primeira Liga after an absence of five years.

Cláudio made his debut in the competition on 12 August 2011, featuring the full 90 minutes in a 2–2 home draw against S.L. Benfica. He scored a career-best eight goals – mostly through penalties– during that campaign, helping the Barcelos-based team to the ninth position.

Following his release from Gil Vicente in the summer of 2013, Cláudio joined second-tier club Académico de Viseu F.C. on a one-year contract.

References

External links

1977 births
Living people
People from São Gonçalo, Rio de Janeiro
Brazilian footballers
Association football defenders
America Football Club (RJ) players
Primeira Liga players
Liga Portugal 2 players
Segunda Divisão players
A.D. Ovarense players
A.D. Lousada players
F.C. Vizela players
C.D. Trofense players
Gil Vicente F.C. players
Académico de Viseu F.C. players
Brazilian expatriate footballers
Expatriate footballers in Portugal
Brazilian expatriate sportspeople in Portugal
Sportspeople from Rio de Janeiro (state)